Sidus Ludoviciana , also known as HD 116798 is an 8th-magnitude giant star in the asterism of the Big Dipper in the constellation Ursa Major, halfway between Mizar and Alcor. It was discovered on 2 December 1722 by Johann Georg Liebknecht, who mistook it for a planet and named it after Louis V, Landgrave of Hesse-Darmstadt. A line-of-sight companion with Mizar and Alcor (with a spectral type similar to the latter), it is roughly four times more distant.  It has the spectral type A8/F0 III.  That spectral class suggests it is a giant star, but evolutionary models place it on the main sequence.

Spectral classification based on a spectrum taken for radial velocity measurement tentatively determined a spectral and luminosity class of A8/F0III, which would indicate that it has exhausted its core hydrogen and started to evolve away from the main sequence, however giant stars of this type should be at least ten times more luminous than measured for Sidus Ludoviciana.

References

External links
 SIMBAD-Entry (SIMBAD)
 Leos Ondra: A New View of Mizar 
 Astrophoto

Ursa Major (constellation)
116798
A-type giants
F-type giants
BD+55 1602
J13245185+5453509
Stars with proper names